Huang Ji, was a Chinese imperial painter during the  Ming Dynasty. His birth and death years are unknown.

Huang Ji was born in Minhou in Fujian Province. He was known for painting people

Notes

References
 Zhongguo gu dai shu hua jian ding zu. 2000. Zhongguo hui hua quan ji. Zhongguo mei shu fen lei quan ji. Beijing: Wen wu chu ban she. Volume 10.

Ming dynasty painters
Year of death unknown
Artists from Fuzhou
Painters from Fujian
Year of birth unknown